Zájezd is a municipality and village in Kladno District in the Central Bohemian Region of the Czech Republic. It has about 100 inhabitants.

Administrative parts
The village of Bůhzdař is an administrative part of Zájezd.

Sights
Zájezd Zoo is located in Zájezd.

References

Villages in Kladno District